The Prorva is a small river in Braslaw District, Vitebsk Region, Belarus, a left tributary of the Drysvyata, which is a tributary of the Dysna (Daugava basin). It flows for 12 km from the Lake Drysvyaty by the village Drysvyaty, close to the former outlet of the river Drysvyata.

In 1953 a local hydroelectric plant "Friendship of Peoples" was constructed by the river. To feed it better, the outlet of the Drysvyata from Lake Drysvyaty was dammed for the whole northern discharge of the lake to go into Prorva.

References

Rivers of Vitebsk Region
Rivers of Belarus
Tributaries of the Dysna